Heinrich Beck Halle is an arena in Leutershausen, Germany.  It is primarily used for team handball. Heinrich Beck Halle holds 1,200 people.

Handball venues in Germany
Indoor arenas in Germany
Buildings and structures in Ansbach (district)
Sports venues in Bavaria